Conchita Martínez won the title by defeating Anna-Lena Grönefeld in the final in three sets.

This tournament marked the return of former world No. 1 Martina Hingis, who lost to Marlene Weingärtner in the first round. It was Hingis' first professional match since October 2002.

Seeds

Draw

Finals

Top half

Bottom half

References

 Main and Qualifying Draws (ITF)
 2005 Tokyo Indoor and Pattaya WTA Singles Results     Maria Sharapova & Conchita Martinez, Champions

Singles
Volvo Women's Open - Singles
 in women's tennis